In mathematics, the Borsuk–Ulam theorem states that every continuous function from an n-sphere into Euclidean n-space maps some pair of antipodal points to the same point. Here, two points on a sphere are called antipodal if they are in exactly opposite directions from the sphere's center.

Formally: if  is continuous then there exists an  such that:  .

The case  can be illustrated by saying that there always exist a pair of opposite points on the Earth's equator with the same temperature. The same is true for any circle. This assumes the temperature varies continuously in space.

The case  is often illustrated by saying that at any moment, there is always a pair of antipodal points on the Earth's surface with equal temperatures and equal barometric pressures, assuming that both parameters vary continuously in space.

The Borsuk–Ulam theorem has several equivalent statements in terms of odd functions.
 If  is a continuous odd function, then there exists an  such that:  .

History

Equivalent statements
The following statements are equivalent to the Borsuk–Ulam theorem.

With odd functions 
A function  is called odd (aka antipodal or antipode-preserving) if for every : .

The Borsuk–Ulam theorem is equivalent to the following statement: A continuous odd function from an n-sphere into Euclidean n-space has a zero. PROOF: 
 If the theorem is correct, then it is specifically correct for odd functions, and for an odd function,  iff . Hence every odd continuous function has a zero.
 For every continuous function , the following function is continuous and odd: . If every odd continuous function has a zero, then  has a zero, and therefore, . Hence the theorem is correct.

With retractions 
Define a retraction as a function  The Borsuk–Ulam theorem is equivalent to the following claim: there is no continuous odd retraction.

Proof: If the theorem is correct, then every continuous odd function from  must include 0 in its range.

Conversely, if it is incorrect, then there is a continuous odd function  with no zeroes. Then we can construct another odd function  by:

since  has no zeroes,  is well-defined and continuous. Thus we have a continuous odd retraction.

Proofs

1-dimensional case
The 1-dimensional case can easily be proved using the intermediate value theorem (IVT).

Let  be an odd real-valued continuous function on a circle. Pick an arbitrary . If  then we are done.

General case

Algebraic topological proof
By passing to orbits under the antipodal action, we then get an induced continuous function  between real projective spaces, which induces an isomorphism on fundamental groups. By the Hurewicz theorem, the induced ring homomorphism on cohomology with  coefficients [where  denotes the field with two elements], 

One can also show the stronger statement that any odd map  has odd degree and then deduce the theorem from this result.

Combinatorial proof
The Borsuk–Ulam theorem can be proved from Tucker's lemma.

Let  be a continuous odd function. Because g is continuous on a compact domain, it is uniformly continuous.

Label each vertex  of the triangulation with a label  in the following way:

 The absolute value of the label is the index of the coordinate with the highest absolute value of g: .
 The sign of the label is the sign of g, so that: .

Because g is odd, the labeling is also odd: . Hence, by Tucker's lemma, there are two adjacent vertices  with opposite labels.

Corollaries

 The ham sandwich theorem: For any compact sets A1, ..., An in  we can always find a hyperplane dividing each of them into two subsets of equal measure.

Equivalent results 
Above we showed how to prove the Borsuk–Ulam theorem from Tucker's lemma. The converse is also true: it is possible to prove Tucker's lemma from the Borsuk–Ulam theorem. Therefore, these two theorems are equivalent.

Generalizations 
 In the original theorem, the domain of the function f is the unit n-sphere (the boundary of the unit n-ball). In general, it is true also when the domain of f is the boundary of any open bounded symmetric subset of  containing the origin (Here, symmetric means that if x is in the subset then -x is also in the subset).

 Consider the function A which maps a point to its antipodal point:  Note that  The original theorem claims that there is a point x in which  In general, this is true also for every function A for which  However, in general this is not true for other functions A.

See also
 Topological combinatorics
 Necklace splitting problem
 Ham sandwich theorem
 Kakutani's theorem (geometry)
 Imre Bárány

Notes

References

External links

Algebraic topology
Combinatorics
Theory of continuous functions
Theorems in topology